Michael Herz may refer to:
 Michael Herz (businessman) (born 1946), owner of Tchibo Holding
 Michael Herz (producer), filmmaker and co-founder of Troma Entertainment